Gina Mainwal is an American rock musician and filmmaker. She is best known as the drummer for Sweet 75, a band formed by Nirvana bassist Krist Novoselic after Nirvana disbanded.  Mainwal has also drummed for the No WTO Combo, a punk rock band also including Novoselic, Jello Biafra, and Kim Thayil.
She had played in many bands in her hometown of Las Vegas, and was known as "Gina The Jet" on the radio station KUNV where she worked with Ken Jordan. She moved to Seattle in 1997. She is a Producer on the feature film Good Kisser that was written and directed by Wendy Jo Carlton. It is distributed by Wolfe Video and available on Netflix. This film, her music videos, and her award-winning short documentary, Signed, Stamped, Dated: the Story of the Typing Explosion have been shown in film festivals around the world.

References 

Year of birth missing (living people)
Living people
American punk rock drummers
American filmmakers
Place of birth missing (living people)
American women drummers
American alternative rock musicians
21st-century American women
Women in punk